Macouria is a commune of French Guiana located midway between Cayenne and Kourou, an overseas region and department of France located in South America. The seat of the commune is the settlement of Tonate, and so the commune is also known unofficially as Macouria-Tonate. The French Guiana Zoo is located in the commune.

Geography 

Macouria is one of the smallest cities of French Guiana.
The town is separated in the east with Matoury, by the Larivot Bridge, crossing the Cayenne River. Its southern limit is marked by the Montsinéry River, which is a separation with the eponymous city. Westward there is Kourou and in the north the town is the Atlantic Ocean.

Urbanization 
 From the Larivot bridge to the town centre, on approximately 28 km, there are many villages.
 From the town center to Kourou, there are few inhabitants except in the farming areas of "La Césarée" and "Matiti".

The main inhabited zones are:
 Maillard : a neighborhood which will host 600 houses on the long run organized around the blue lake, which is a former quarry.
 Soula : located in the East of the town not far away from Cayenne.
 Matiti: situated 10 km after the town centre, it is based on land given back by the Guiana Space Centre.

History 
The area was first described in 1604 by Daniel de La Touche de La Ravardière. He counted many Amerindian settlements. Around 1716, the commune was settled with plantations. Tonat build the first house and cotton mill.

In the middle of the 19th century, Macouria was part of the canton of Cayenne. 
1488 slaves stood for 93% of the population of the "neighborhood" led by Jean-Baptiste Tonat. They worked in a plantation called "La Béarnaise". On it, there were :
 25 ha of sugar cane
 8 ha of cofe
 60 ha of roucou
1100 ha of cotton

In tribute to the leader of the neighbourhood Tonat, the zone was called "Tonate Bourg" and given to the state.

In 1848, year of the abolition of slavery  some free Africans and 55 Indian migrants arrived in the city.
From 1864 to 1970 the population decreased, mainly because of the lack of activity on it.

Population

Sights
The French Guiana Zoo is located in Macouria on the road to Montsinéry.

See also
Communes of French Guiana
Farnous

References

External links
Official site (in French)

Communes of French Guiana